Durham City Association Football Club is a football club based in Durham, England.

History
The club was established in 1918 and initially competed in the Victory League, which was set up in celebration of the end of World War I, finishing bottom of the table. In 1919 they joined the North Eastern League, finishing fifth in their first season. Despite a mid-table finish in 1920–21, they were one of fourteen clubs automatically elected to the newly formed Third Division North of the Football League in 1921. They finished bottom of the division in 1922–23, but were re-elected. In 1925–26 the club reached the second round of the FA Cup for the first time, losing 3–0 at home to Division Three North rivals Southport. After finishing second-from-bottom in 1927–28, the club failed to win re-election, gaining only 11 votes to the 22 received by the newly elected Carlisle United. 

Durham dropped back into Division One of the North Eastern League, replacing their reserve team. They finished bottom of Division One in 1928–29 and were relegated to Division Two. However, after finishing as Division Two runners-up in 1930–31, they were promoted back to Division One. In 1933 the club was renamed City of Durham. After three consecutive finishes in the bottom three between 1934–35 and 1936–37, they ended the 1937–38 season bottom of the league. They dropped into the Wearside League, but folded in November 1938, partly due to the introduction of greyhound racing at their Holiday Park ground.

The club was re-established in 1949, and joined the Wearside League for the 1950–51 season. After two seasons they were admitted to the Northern League. The club finished bottom of the league in 1954–55, but the following season saw them reach the first round of the FA Cup for the first time as a non-League club, eventually losing 3–1 at local rivals Bishop Auckland. In 1957–58 they went one better, reaching the second round, where they lost 3–0 at home to Tranmere Rovers in front of Ferens Park's record crowd. The club finished bottom of the Northern League again in 1960–61, 1963–64 and 1965–66, but were runners-up in 1970–71. After the league gained a second division in 1982, they were relegated to Division Two at the end of the 1983–84 season. However, a third-place finish in 1987–88 saw them promoed back to Division One.

After three seasons in Division One, Durham were relegated back to Division Two at the end of the 1990–91 season, which had seen them finish bottom of the table. However, they were runners-up in Division Two the following season, and were promoted back to Division One. They went on to win their first league title in 1993–94, also winning the league's Cleator Cup. Although the club were relegated at the end of the 1997–98 season, they won Division Two the following season to make an immediate return to Division One. They won the League Cup and the Cleator Cup in 2001–02 and finished as Division One runners-up in 2003–04. After winning the league for a second time and the Cleator Cup for a third time in 2007–08, they were promoted to Division One North of the Northern Premier League.

Durham's first season in the Northern Premier League saw them win Division One North, earning promotion to the Premier Division; they also won the league's Chairman's Cup. However, their main sponsor withdrew in the summer of 2009 after the Football Conference ruled that they would not accept clubs with artificial pitches, which Durham had. As a result, the club lost most of its players and won only two league matches during the 2009–10 season. They finished bottom of the table with zero points after having six points deducted for playing a player under a false name, and were relegated back to Division One North. Although they managed to finish in mid-table in the following two seasons, they resigned from the league at the end of the 2011–12 season and returned to Division One of the Northern League. After finishing in the bottom three in 2015–16, the club were relegated to Division Two.

In 2021–22 Durham finished bottom of Division Two of the Northern League and were relegated to Division One of the Wearside League.

Season-by-season record

Ground
The club initially played at Garden House Park before moving to Kepier Haughs in 1920. Due to its distance from the city centre, the club relocated to Holiday Park in 1923.

After being reformed, the club played at Ferens Park until the end of the 1993–94 season. During the 1994–95 season they played at Chester-le-Street Town's Moor Park, before moving to New Ferens Park in 1995. The ground has a capacity of 2,700, of which 270 is seated and 750 covered. An artificial pitch was installed in 2006. However, a dispute with the landlord led to the club moving to Consett's Belle View Stadium in 2015, where they played until the end of the 2016–17 season. They then moved to Willington's Hall Lane ground prior to the 2017–18 season. In 2022 the club relocated to Leyburn Grove in Houghton-le-Spring.

Honours
Northern Premier League
Division One North champions 2008–09
Chairman's Cup winners 2008–09
Northern League
Division One champions 1993–94, 2007–08
Division Two champions 1998–99
League Cup winners 2001–02
Cleator Cup winners 1994–95, 2001–02, 2008–09
Durham Challenge Cup
Winners 1971–72
Durham FA Benevolent Bowl
 Winners 1955–56

Records
Best FA Cup performance: Second round, 1925–26, 1957–58
Best FA Trophy performance: Second round, 2008–09
Best FA Vase performance: Semi-finals, 2001–02
Record attendance: 7,886 vs Darlington, FA Cup fifth qualifying round, 3 December 1921
At Holiday Park: 7,182 vs West Stanley, FA Cup, 17 September 1923
At Ferens Park: 7,000 vs Tranmere Rovers, FA Cup second round, 7 November 1957

See also
Durham City A.F.C. players
Durham City A.F.C. managers

References

External links

Official website

 
Football clubs in England
Football clubs in County Durham
Sport in Durham, England
Association football clubs established in 1918
1918 establishments in England
North Eastern League
Former English Football League clubs
Wearside Football League
Northern Football League
Northern Premier League clubs
Willington, County Durham